Teloitus is the second studio album by the Finnish death metal band Sotajumala. It entered the Finnish charts at position 17 on its release week.

Track listing

Personnel
Mynni Luukkainen – vocals
Kosti Orbinski – guitar
Pete Lapio – guitar
Tomi Otsala – bass, backing vocals
Timo Häkkinen –  drums

References

External links
 Teloitus at last.fm

2007 albums
Sotajumala albums